Jerry Don Gray (born December 16, 1962) is an American football coach and former player who is the assistant head coach/defense for the Atlanta Falcons of the National Football League (NFL). Gray played college football at the University of Texas at Austin, where he garnered All-American honors.  Thereafter, he played professionally for the Los Angeles Rams, Houston Oilers, and Tampa Bay Buccaneers of the NFL.

Early years

Gray was born in Lubbock, Texas.  He attended Lubbock Estacado High School.

College

Gray was a two-time consensus first-team All-American at the University of Texas. During his career, he was known for being an especially hard hitter.  He had 297 career tackles, 16 interceptions and 20 passes broken up and played on four bowl teams at Texas coached by Fred Akers.  In 2013, he was inducted into the College Football Hall of Fame.

Playing career
Gray was the Rams' first-round choice in the 1985 NFL Draft and played seven years in Los Angeles before finishing his career with the Oilers in 1992 and the Buccaneers in 1993. He had 28 career interceptions, including six for the Oilers in 1992.

Gray was selected to the Pro Bowl four times attending the game from 1986 through 1989. In his final appearance he earned Pro Bowl MVP honors after recording 7 tackles and a 51-yard interception return for a touchdown.

In 2001, Gray was nominated for the Pro Football Hall of Fame, but was not chosen as a semi-finalist.

Coaching career

SMU
After retiring as a player, Gray turned to coaching. His coaching career began in 1995 as a defensive backs coach for the SMU Mustangs football team.

Tennessee Oilers/Titans
He then worked for the Tennessee Oilers as a Defensive Quality Control coach from 1997 to 1998 before being promoted to defensive backs coach in 1999 when the team name was changed from "Oilers" to "Titans".

Buffalo Bills
In 2001, he was hired by former Titans defensive coordinator Gregg Williams to run the Buffalo Bills defense the same year Williams left Tennessee to become the Buffalo Head Coach. He served as the defensive coordinator for the Buffalo Bills from 2001 to 2005, where he oversaw one of the top defenses in the NFL until his final season. The Bills ranked 2nd in total defense in both 2003 and 2004.

Washington Redskins
After the 2005 season he was hired by the Washington Redskins to serve as their defensive backs coach

Seattle Seahawks
On January 18, 2010, Gray was hired as the new defensive backs coach for the Seattle Seahawks where he coached the rookie safety tandem of Earl Thomas and Kam Chancellor.

Texas
On January 17, 2011, Gray agreed to return to his alma mater Texas as the assistant head coach and defensive backs coach.

Tennessee Titans (second stint)
On February 12, 2011, however, Gray rejoined the Titans as their defensive coordinator.

Minnesota Vikings
On January 22, 2014, Gray was hired as the new defensive backs coach for the Minnesota Vikings.

Green Bay Packers
On January 29, 2020, Gray was hired as defensive backs coach for the Green Bay Packers. On March 1, 2021, Gray was promoted to defensive backs/passing game coordinator.

Atlanta Falcons
On January 31, 2023, Gray was hired as assistant head coach/defense for the Atlanta Falcons.

Personal life
Gray and his wife Sherry, also from Lubbock, have two sons together. The eldest was a defensive back for the SMU Mustangs.

Gray started the Jerry Gray Foundation in 2002 and it continues to actively supports youth in Lubbock, providing scholarships in partnership with Texas Tech.

See also
List of Texas Longhorns football All-Americans
List of Los Angeles Rams first-round draft picks

References

External links
 Green Bay Packers bio
Official Seahawks website biography of Coach Gray

1962 births
Living people
All-American college football players
American football cornerbacks
American football safeties
Buffalo Bills coaches
College Football Hall of Fame inductees
Green Bay Packers coaches
Houston Oilers players
Los Angeles Rams players
National Conference Pro Bowl players
National Football League defensive coordinators
People from Lubbock, Texas
Players of American football from Texas
Seattle Seahawks coaches
SMU Mustangs football coaches
Tampa Bay Buccaneers players
Tennessee Oilers coaches
Tennessee Titans coaches
Texas Longhorns football players
Washington Redskins coaches
Ed Block Courage Award recipients